In music, Op. 72 stands for Opus number 72. Compositions that are assigned this number include:

 Beethoven – Fidelio
 Dvořák – Slavonic Dances, Series II
 Klebe – Das Mädchen aus Domrémy
 Prokofiev – Russian Overture
 Schumann – Four Fugues (Vier Fugen) for piano
 Scriabin – Vers la flamme
 Strauss – Intermezzo